Glover Edwin Ruckstell (5 May 1891 - 28 May 1963) was an American engineer and race car driver.

Biography
Ruckstell was born in San Francisco, California to John R. Ruckstell and Eleanor G. Brown. He completed 2 years of high school and then dropped out. By 1914 he was working as an engineer and a race car driver.

In 1917 he became the assistant to Lieutenant Colonel Elbert J. Hall for tests on the Liberty L-12 aircraft engine. During the 1920s Ruckstell became the president and general manager of the Ruckstell Corporation. In the 1930s he was awarded Commercial Pilot’s License #10,006 C.A.A. He became president and the general manager of Grand Canyon Airlines.

He died on 28 May 1963 in Riverside, California. He was buried in Desert Memorial Park in Cathedral City, California.

Legacy
His papers are archived at the San Diego Air and Space Museum Library and Archives.

References

1891 births
1963 deaths
Auto racing people
American automotive engineers
20th-century American engineers